Farro is a Catalan and Italian surname. Notable people with the surname include:

José Escajadillo Farro (born 1942), Peruvian composer
Josh Farro (born 1987), American musician and songwriter
Maria Elena Foronda Farro, Peruvian sociologist and environmentalist
Mónica Farro (born 1976), Uruguayan model and actress
Ricardo Farro (born 1985), Peruvian football player
Sarah Farro, 19th century American novelist
Zac Farro (born 1990), American musician, singer and songwriter, brother of Josh

See also
El Putget i Farró, a neighbourhood in Barcelona, Spain

Italian-language surnames
Spanish-language surnames